Eon, also spelled On, or Un, Ohn, Uhn is a single-syllable Korean given name, and an element in two-syllable Korean given names. Its meaning differs based on the hanja used to write it. There are 14 Hanja with the reading "eon" on the South Korean government's official list of hanja which may be registered for use in given names.

People with this name include:

Lee Un-ju (born 1972), South Korean lawyer and politician
Kim Eon (born 1973), South Korean poet
Lee Si-eon (born Lee Bo-yeon, 1982), South Korean actor
Hwang Seung-eon (born 1988), South Korean actress

See also
List of Korean given names

References

Korean given names